Crunch time may refer to:

 Crunch Time (album), a 1999 album by saxophonist Hank Crawford and organist Jimmy McGriff
 Crunch Time (TV series), an Australian television series
 Crunch Time (web series), an American web television series
 Crunch Time (play), an Australian play by David Williamson

See also
 Shturmovshchina, the Russian equivalent of "crunch time"
Crunch (video games), a time period in which video game developers are expected to work overtime